Friedrich Karl Igel (also Frederico Carlos Igel; 1898 – unknown) was an Austrian chess player and writer.

Biography
In 1914, Fritz Igel shared 1st — 2nd place in Chess Club Donaustadt tournament. He played in many important chess tournaments in the 1920s and 1930s, including Vienna's Leopold Trebitsch Memorial Tournaments.

Fritz Igel played for Austria in the Chess Olympiad:
 In 1933, at reserve board in the 5th Chess Olympiad in Folkestone (+1, =1, -2).

Presumably, in adulthood, he moved to Brazil. He is the author of two books about chess:
 Um die Weltmeisterschaft im Schachspiel Wien 1950. (in German).
 As Regras Enxadrísticas do Super Matador São Paulo 1972. (in Portuguese, author name is indicated as Frederico Carlos Igel).

References

External links

Fritz Igel chess games at 365chess.com

1898 births
Year of death missing
Austrian chess players
Chess Olympiad competitors
Chess writers